Cuthbert Joseph Obwangor (1 November 1920 – 19 May 2012) was a longtime Ugandan minister and legislator. He was a minister and a political prisoner for the Apollo Milton Obote regime after he opposed Obote's extension of power while Obwangor was a minister.

Early life
Cuthbert Joseph Obwangor was born in Kiiya Village, Omasia Parish, Katakwi District, Eastern Region, Uganda on 1 November 1920. He is a member of the Iteso ethnic group.

Education 
He attended Ngora Catholic Church Primary School. He later attended the Nyenga Seminary, then attended Namilyango College from 1939 to 1941, City College Coventry and the Railway Traffic School in Nairobi, Kenya from 1942 to 1946.

Career

Business 
After graduating from the Railway Traffic School, Obwangor worked in Kenya at the East African Railways and Harbours Corporation before returning to Uganda in 1951. He first entered politics in Kenya, when he worked for Jomo Kenyatta and the Kenya African National Union executive council. Upon his return to Teso sub-region, he became a prominent businessperson in Magoro within the Magoro market where he built and ran a restaurant.

Political career

Pre-Independence 
In 1952, Obwangor entered Ugandan politics. He was elected to the Teso District Council and was elected to represent the Teso District at the Uganda Legislative Council, the precursor to the Parliament of Uganda during British colonial rule when Uganda was the Uganda Protectorate. He was a founding member of the Uganda National Congress, the first legal political party in Uganda that later merged into the Uganda People's Congress in 1960.

Obote Government 
After the Independence of Uganda, the Uganda Legislative Council of the Uganda Protectorate dissolved on Tuesday 9 October 1962, being replaced on Wednesday 10 October 1962 by the independent Parliament of Uganda for the newly independent Republic of Uganda. Obwangor represented Teso again in the Parliament of Uganda. Ethnic conflict threatened to spry up after the independence of Uganda, and ethnic groups were naming kings to fight for their respective ethnic groups, and the traditionally kingless ITeso people attempted to name Obwangor as Iteso king, but Obwangor refused as he was dedicated to a multi-ethnic unified Uganda.

Obwangor was a committed member of the Uganda People's Congress, the party of President Apollo Milton Obote that emerged from the pre-independence Uganda National Congress political party. Obwangor served as the treasurer of the Uganda People's Congress from the party's creation in 1960 until 1967, during which he oversaw the finances of the construction of the Uganda House.

During the Apollo Milton Obote regime, Obwangor served in numerous ministerial positions as a part of his cabinet. When Apollo Milton Obote succeeded Benedicto Kiwanuka, Apollo Milton Obote appointed Obwangor to be Minister of Regional Affairs, which briefly assumed the responsibilities of the Ministry of Internal Affairs. Felix Kenyi Onama also can lay claim to the Minister of Interior position between 1962 and 1964, as he was Minister of Works and Labour. That role assumed some of the other responsibilities of the Minister of Interior such as leading the Ugandan National Police Force. Obwangor and Felix Kenyi Onama were succeeded in their roles in 1964 by Basil Kiiza Bataringaya, who headed the newly created Ministry of Home Affairs, later renamed to be the Ministry of Internal Affairs. Bataringaya assumed the role after he flipped parties and joined the Obote administration.

After he left the Ministry of Internal Affairs, Cuthbert Joseph Obwangor became Minister of Justice and Constitutional Affairs in 1964, succeeding Grace Ibingira. He also assumed the role of Minister of Housing and Labour in February 1966, serving in that role concurrently with being the Ugandan Minister of Justice and Constitutional Affairs. He remained as Minister of Justice and Constitutional Affairs and Minister of Housing and Labour until May 1966, when he became Minister of Commerce and Industry of Uganda.

Imprisonment 
Obwangor, then minister of Commerce and Industry in Uganda, began to fall out of favor of President Apollo Milton Obote when he spoke out in favor of restraints on the presidential power in Uganda, with the following an excerpt from the journal of the Parliament of Uganda with his speech on 11 July 1967: 

After this disagreement and pushback upon Apollo Milton Obote's assumption of additional powers, Obwangor was fired from his role as Minister of Commerce and Industry of Uganda. On 19 December 1969, there was an Assassination attempt on Apollo Milton Obote's life, wounding him. The assassination attempt was allegedly led by Baganda civilians. Despite this, Obwangor along with Benedicto Kiwanuka, Paul Ssemogerere, Mathias Ngobi, and others were arrested, allegedly on the orders of Basil Kiiza Bataringaya and Felix Kenyi Onama. Obwangor was arrested at his home in Soroti while he was his with his children. He was taken to Luzira Maximum Security Prison by way of Mbale, and he was imprisoned at the Luzira Maximum Security Prison. In a 2012 interview, Obwangor alleged that because he was a political prisoner, "there was no mistreatment" while he was imprisoned in Luzira Maximum Security Prison.

On 2 February 1971, the new head of state of Uganda Idi Amin released Obwangor, along with all other political prisoners in Uganda.

Post Imprisonment career 
Obwangor reentered the political arena following his release, rejoining the Uganda People's Congress after the party temporarily excommunicated Obwangor after the leader of the Uganda People's Congress imprisoned Obwangor. In 1982, Obwangor shifted allegiances and joined the Democratic Party of Uganda.  In 1984, Obwangor founded the Nationalist Liberal Party alongside Tiberio Okeny Atwoma, Anthony Ochaya, and Francis Bwengye. The Nationalist Liberalist Party was a splinter group from the leading opposition party at the time, the Democratic Party of Uganda. The Nationalist Liberal Party was created in response to former acting Secretary General of the Democratic Party Tiberio Okeny Atwoma's unsuccessful challenge to Paul Kawanga Ssemogerere for the leadership of the Democratic Party (Uganda).

In 1986, Obwangor left the Nationalist Liberal Party, joining the National Resistance Movement party led by the new Head of State of Uganda, Yoweri Museveni. He was appointed by Yoweri Museveni in 1989 to serve as a member of the Justice Benjamin Josses Odoki led Uganda Constitutional Commission, which was tasked with reforming the Constitution of Uganda.

In 1997, Obwangor left the National Resistance Movement, rejoining his original political party the Uganda People's Congress, although he left them after four years becoming a political independent which he remained until his death, stating in a 2007 interview that "politics is like wind, you move with the current affairs and temperature of the time".

Obwangor was also committed to improving educational services for the poor of Uganda. Between 1986 and 1990 during the Lord's Resistance Army insurgency, many members of the afflicted areas fled to the more stable town of Soroti, Obwangor's hometown. This led Obwangor to help establish a school for displaced children at Moru Apesur in Soroti Town.

Death 
Obwangor passed away on 18 May 2012 at 93 years old. He died at his daughter's, Angela Margaret Itinot's home, in Omodoi, Soroti, Uganda. Obwangor had a large state funeral that turned into a political affair.  Members of the Uganda People's Congress fought with members of the National Resistance Movement at the funeral in Katakwi over who should speak, with the National Resistance Movement claiming the Uganda People's Congress neglected Obwangor in his time of need and therefore MP Olara Otunnu, a leader of the Uganda People's Congress, should be forbidden from speaking, something that resulted in brawls at the funeral until Otunnu was allowed to address the funeral.

Legacy 
Obwangor House at Teso College Aloet was named in honor of Cuthbert Joseph Obwangor. The website for the school says that:

Personal life 
He built his home, the Alakara House on Obwangor Road Soroti, Uganda in 1968. He lived there with his eight children and his wife, Anna Maria Abura.

Obwangor is a Catholic.

References and notes

1920 births
Kenya African National Union politicians
National Resistance Movement politicians
Uganda People's Congress politicians
Itesot people
People from Soroti District
Ugandan Roman Catholics
Ugandan prisoners and detainees
Ugandan businesspeople
2012 deaths